Woleaian is the main language of the island of Woleai and surrounding smaller islands in the state of Yap of the Federated States of Micronesia.  Woleaian is a Chuukic language. Within that family, its closest relative is Satawalese, with which it is largely mutually intelligible.  Woleaian is spoken by approximately 1700 people. Woleai has a writing system of its own, a syllabary based on the Latin alphabet.

Introduction

History
Most Woleaian speakers or Woleaians as they are more commonly known as are mostly found in the Federated States of Micronesia, and the Central and Eastern Caroline Islands. More specifically most of the speakers are found in Yap State in Micronesia where Woleaian is considered an official language. Most Woleaian speakers are classified as Pacific Islanders and Micronesian (People-In-Country Profile). The island of Yap is broken up into two parts: Yap Proper, which is made up of Gagil, Tomil, Fanif, Weloy, and Rull—and the Yap Outer Islands, which is made up of Ulithi, Faris/Sorol, Ngulu, Woleai, Eauripik, Ifalik, Faraulap, Elato, Lamotrek and Satawal. Aside from Woleaian, many speakers in Yap and other nearby places speak other languages, like Yapese, Satawalese, Ulithian, English, Chuukese, Kosraean, Pingelapese, Pohnpeian, Mwoakilloan, and some Asian and Polynesian Languages (Yap Census Report, 2002).
The Woleaian language and culture is very important to the Woleaian people, as well as their history. The Woleaian history is passed down from generation to generation by storytelling. By doing so this helps to keep their language alive. As well as passing down their history, they also pass down their music, which is important to them. An important part of their culture is their clothing. Their clothing is so important to them that they have strict rules against wearing any type of western clothing. They also enjoy using canoes to get around instead of motorboats, and simple things like beautiful beaches and going fishing. They also enjoy working and spending time with their family and friends (Team).

Population
In 1987, a Yap Census was taken and reported that there were about 1,630 people speaking the language. 13 years later when the census was taken in 2000 there was an increase of speakers and about 5,000 people were speaking or knew the language. Of these 5,000 speakers about 4,500 of them spoke Woleaian as their first language and 500 of them as their second language (Yap Census Report, 2002).

Classification
Woleaian is classified as an Austronesian, Malayo-Polynesian, Central-Eastern Malayo-Polynesian, Eastern Malayo-Polynesian, Oceanic, Central-Eastern Oceanic, Remote Oceanic, Micronesian, Micronesian Proper, Chuukic-Pohnpeic, Chuukic language (Woleaian).

Phonology
Woleaian has geminate (long) consonants and vowels.

In the orthography of Sohn (1975), along with a few approximations in the IPA, the inventory is,

Note that both sh and r become ch when long, and that l becomes nn.

Vowels occur long and short, except for eo and oa, which are only found long.

All simple vowels except a can occur as voiceless vowels in word-final position. (All simple vowels can also occur as word-final voiced vowels.) Though these voiceless vowels are generally not spelled out by native speakers, they represent an important change in pronunciation between words which are otherwise spelled the same. For example:

besh [beshi̥]        "hot"
besh [beshe̥]        "lime"
yalius [yaliusi̥u̥]   "ghost"
yalius [yaliuse̥]    "beard"
lamw [lamwu̥]        "mosquito"
lamw [lamwo̥]        "lagoon"

Syllable structure
In the Woleaian language words can have anywhere from one to three consonants in a row. Words may either have CV, CCV, CCCV, or VV syllable structures, and words can end in consonants (Sohn, 1975).

Grammar

Word formation

Inflectional patterns
There are four inflectional paradigms in Woleaian: possessive, objective, progressive, and plural.

Possessive
These suffixes, attached to nouns, convey the person and number of a possessor. There are seven regular possessive suffixes and one defective possessive suffix. 

The "defective" suffix is always followed by a noun, unlike regular possessive suffixes.

Examples:

metal              'his eyes'
metal John         'eyes of John'
metaar             'their eyes'
metal John me Mary 'eyes of John and Mary'

Object
These suffixes occur with all transitive verbs and show person, number, and animateness of the object of that verb.

Progressive
Progressive action is shown in Woleaian through reduplication of initial parts of verbs. For example: mil "to stay" becomes mimmil "to be staying."

Plural
Plurality of nouns is generally left up to context, but the plural marker ka is added when nouns are accompanied by a demonstrative pronoun.

Basic word order
Woleaian has many different sentences types—and the type of sentence determines the word order. The first types of sentences are major and minor sentences. Major sentences are expressions that contain a subject and a predicate. (Sohn, Woleaian Reference Grammar, 1975). Within a major sentence it can be broken up into two types, simple and complex sentences. Simple major sentences have a subject associated with a predicate. In a simple major sentence, the subject and predicates are interchangeable—so sometimes the subject comes first, and sometimes the predicate comes first. Simple major sentences can then be broken up into either equational or predicative. In an equational sentence the subject always follows the predicate, whether a question or statement. In predicative sentences, a subject or noun phrase usually follows a predicate. Two or more simple sentences together within one sentence produces a complex major sentence. Complex major sentences can either be coordinative or subordinative. Minor sentences are without "...a subject, a predicate, or both, but still express a complete thought.” (Sohn, Woleaian Reference Grammar, 1975). Just as major sentence can be divided into two types, so can minor sentences. Some refer back to the context and complete it, (completive), and some that appear independently, (exclamatory). (Sohn, Woleaian Reference Grammar, 1975). The problem with equational and predicative statement and question sentences in Woleaian is that you cannot differentiate between the question and statement based on how the words are arranged. An example of this in an equational sentence is ‘‘“Iiy semal sar skuul”’’, which can translate to “He is a student" or "is he a student?”—and in a predicative sentence, ‘‘“Go weri saw we”’’ which can translate to “You saw the child" or "Did you see the child?” (Sohn, Woleaian Reference Grammar, 1975).

Reduplication
Many words in Woleaian, especially verbs, use reduplication, (Kennedy). They use both whole stem and partial reduplications “as initial or medial consonant doubling and initial or final reduplication,” (Sohn, Woleaian Reference Grammar, 1975). An example of this is the word ‘‘fiyefiy’’, which means to squeeze and comes from the word ‘‘fiya’’, which means squeeze it. Some nouns also use reduplication, like ‘‘ugoug’’ or gallbladder, which reduplicates the word ‘‘ug’’ for net. Reduplication in Woleaian can be found in adjectives—like the word ‘‘yangoyang’’, meaning to be yellow, yellowish of ginger color, which comes from the word yang, which means ginger. (Sohn & Tawerilmang, Woleaian-English Dictionary, 1976). Another type of reduplication in Woleaian is reduplication-prefixation, which is when “a neutral verb has both reduplication and the causative prefix/” (Sohn, Woleaian Reference Grammar, 1975). An example of this is the Woleaian word ‘‘gareparep’’, which means to get close. This word comes from the words ‘‘garepa’’ meaning approach to it, and ‘‘rep’’, meaning to be near (Sohn, Woleaian Reference Grammar, 1975).

Vocabulary

Indigenous vocabulary
 means ‘to stir’
 means ‘to marry’
 means ‘to remember’
 means ‘to be strong’
 means ‘to lick’
 means ‘to scatter’
 means ‘to chip off’
 means ‘to broil’
 means ‘to vomit’
 means ‘to hug’

Loanwords
Many loanwords in Woleaian come from Spanish, Japanese and English.

Words from Spanish: (Sohn, Woleaian Reference Grammar, 1975)

Words from Japanese: (Sohn & Tawerilmang, Woleaian-English Dictionary, 1976)
 comes from the Japanese word  ('soldier')
 comes from the Japanese word  ('ice')
 comes from the Japanese word  ('to be in trouble')
 comes from the Japanese word  ('congratulations/happy holidays' in Japanese; 'New Year' in Woleaian)
 comes from the Japanese word  (drum)

Words from English: (Sohn & Tawerilmang, Woleaian-English Dictionary, 1976)
 means ‘flag’
 means ‘fry pan’
 means ‘inch’
 means ‘clock’
 means ‘America’
 means 'papaya'

Endangerment

Materials
There are many resources on the Woleaian language—including books, websites, research papers, and even YouTube videos. Two books in particular are helpful in learning about the Woleaian language: the Woleaian Reference Grammar book by Ho-Min Sohn, and a Woleaian-English Dictionary by Ho-Min Sohn and Anthony Tawerilmang. These two books contain much information about the Woleaian language, such as the sentence structures, types of reduplication, vocabulary, etc. Many websites contain useful information. The 2000 Yap Census also provides information about the language and speakers. A few research papers are helpful as well. One by Tsz-him Tsui from the University of Hawaii at Manoa describes the Woleaian vocabulary and phonemes. A paper by Robert Kennedy from the University of Arizona is about Woleaian reduplication. Lastly, a YouTube channel provides Woleaian videos. Some of the videos are of church services, cultural dances similar to the hula, and Woleaian people singing Woleaian songs.

Vitality
Woleaian, under the Expanded Graded Intergenerational Disruption Scale (EGIDS, which determines the status of a language, is level five, a developing language. This means that it “is in vigorous use, with literature in a standardized form being used by some people, though it is not yet widespread or sustainable.” (Lewis, Simons & Fennig, 2013). From the rapid growth of Woleaian in 1987 to 2000 it is pretty safe to say that Woleaian is being transmitted and taught to young children. There is intergenerational transmission involved in Woleaian because of its language status on the EGIDS. It is described as a developing language in vigorous use—which means that the Woleaian speakers must pass it down from generation to generation.

References

Further reading
Sohn, H.M. 1975. Woleaian Reference Grammar. University of Hawaii Press. 

Kennedy, R, (n.d.). ‘‘Stress and Allomorphy in Woleaian Reduplication.’’ http://uts.cc.utexas.edu/~tls/2002tls/Robert_Kennedy.pdf
Sohn, H.-m., & Tawerilmang, A. F. (1976). ‘‘Woleaian-English Dictionary’’. Honolulu: The University Press of Hawaii.
Tsui, T.-H. ‘‘Japanese loanwords in Woleaian.’’ Honolulu, University of Hawaii.

External links
 
Team, S. (n.d.). ‘‘Teaching Guide The Woleai People.’’ Retrieved March 31, 2014, from Vernacular Media: http://www.vernacularmedia.org/images/0/0a/Woleai_People.pdf

Chuukic languages
Endangered Austronesian languages
Languages of the Federated States of Micronesia
Severely endangered languages